NACC may refer to:
National Anti-Corruption Commission Australia
National Anti-Corruption Commission Thailand
National Anti-Corruption Commission Saudi Arabia
National Assessment on Climate Change, a massive multidisciplinary effort to study and portray the potential effects of human-induced global warming on the United States
National Association for Colitis and Crohn's Disease (UK)
National Association of Catholic Chaplains, a professional association for certified chaplains and clinical pastoral educators.
National Association of Counsel for Children, an association that aims to improve legal representation for children.
National Autocycle and Cyclemotor Club
National Automobile Chamber of Commerce, an early name for the Automobile Manufacturers Association,
Naval Acquisition Career Center or Naval Acquisition Intern Program
North American Car Co., a manufacturer of railroad rolling stock
North American Choral Company, a choir based out of Grand Rapids, Michigan, USA
North American Christian Convention, an annual meeting of ministers and other active leaders in the Independent Christian Churches/Churches of Christ
North American Classification Committee, a committee evaluates and codifies the latest scientific developments in the systematics, classification, nomenclature, and distribution of North and Middle American birds.
North American College and Community Radio Chart, a weekly top 200 radio chart tracking college radio in North America
North American Competitiveness Council, an official tri-national working group of the Security and Prosperity Partnership of North America
North Atlantic Cooperation Council, the precursor to the Euro-Atlantic Partnership Council
Northeast Alabama Community College, a two-year community college on the border of Jackson and DeKalb Counties.
Northern Athletics Collegiate Conference, A conference competing in NCAA Division III in the Upper Midwest.
Norwegian American Chamber of Commerce
Nucleus accumbens, a brain structure